The Yellow Rose of Texas is a 1944 American Western film directed by Joseph Kane.

Plot summary 
Singing cowboy Roy Rogers (Roy Rogers) is an insurance investigator sent to find a stash of money lifted from a company payroll. Portraying a performer on a showboat as an undercover guise, Roy meets Betty Weston (Dale Evans), the daughter of the alleged robber Sam Weston (Harry Shannon), who has recently escaped from prison. Together, Roy and Betty set out to prove her father was wrongly accused and track down the real criminal.

Cast 
Roy Rogers as Roy Rogers
Trigger as Trigger Smartest Horse in the Movies
Dale Evans as Betty Weston
Grant Withers as Express Agent Lucas
Harry Shannon as Sam Weston
George Cleveland as Captain "Cap" Joe
William Haade as Buster, Roy's Sidekick
Weldon Heyburn as Charley Goss
Hal Taliaferro as Ferguson
Tom London as Sheriff Allen
Dick Botiller as Indian Pete
Janet Martin as Showboat Singer
Bob Nolan as Singer
Peter Lawman as Singer
Sons of the Pioneers as Musicians

Soundtrack 
 "Take It Easy" (Written by Xavier Cugat, Irving Taylor and Vic Mizzy)
 "The Timber Trail" (Written by Tim Spencer)
 "A Two-Seated Saddle and a One-Gaited Horse" (Written by Tim Spencer)
 "Western Wonderland" (Music by Ken Carson, lyrics by Guy Savage)
 "Song of the Rover" (Written by Bob Nolan)
 "Lucky Me, Unlucky You" (Written by Charles Henderson)
 "Down Mexico Way" (Music by Jule Styne, lyrics by Sol Meyer and Eddie Cherkose)
 "Vira do minho" (Traditional)
 "The Yellow Rose of Texas" (Traditional)

External links 

1944 films
1944 Western (genre) films
American Western (genre) films
American black-and-white films
Republic Pictures films
Films set in Texas
Films with screenplays by Jack Townley
Films directed by Joseph Kane
1940s English-language films
1940s American films